Escalation is a 1968 Italian film written and directed by Roberto Faenza and starring Claudine Auger and Gabriele Ferzetti.

Cast 
 Lino Capolicchio	 : Luca Lambertenghi
 Claudine Auger	: Carla Maria Manini	
 Gabriele Ferzetti		: Augusto Lambertenghi	
 Didi Perego	: L'investigatrice privata	
 Leopoldo Trieste	 : Il sacerdote/ il santone	
 Paola Corinti		
 Dada Gallotti		
 Jacqueline Perrier

References

External links
 

1968 films
Italian comedy thriller films
1960s Italian-language films
Films directed by Roberto Faenza
Films scored by Ennio Morricone
1968 directorial debut films
1960s Italian films